Bühlerzell is a municipality in the district of Schwäbisch Hall in Baden-Württemberg in Germany.

References

Schwäbisch Hall (district)
Württemberg